Horowhenua District is a territorial authority district on the west coast of the North Island of New Zealand, administered by Horowhenua District Council. Located north of Wellington and Kapiti, it stretches from slightly north of the town of Ōtaki in the south to just south of Himatangi in the north, and from the coast to the top of the Tararua Range. It is in the Manawatū-Whanganui local government region. The name Horowhenua is Māori for landslide.

Levin is the main town and the seat of the district council. Other towns include Foxton, Shannon and Tokomaru. The population of the district is

History
Horowhenua County was established in 1885 from the southern part of Manawatu County. It stretched from the Manawatū River, Opiki and Tokomaru in the north, to Waikanae and the Waikanae River in the south. The county offices were in Ōtaki until 1896, when they were moved to Levin.

Horowhenua District was established in 1989 from a merger of Horowhenua County, Foxton Borough, Levin Borough and part of the first Manawatu District, as part of New Zealand local government reforms. The southern part of Horowhenua County – the Waikanae and Otaki areas – became part of Kapiti Coast District.

Populated places
Horowhenua District consists of the following towns, localities, settlements and communities (larger towns shown in bold):

 Kere Kere Ward:
 Foxton
 Foxton Beach
 Moutua
 Levin Ward:
 Levin
 Weraroa
 Miranu Ward:
 Makerua
 Mangaore
 Opiki
 Shannon
 Tokomaru

 Waiopehu Ward:
 Gladstone
 Heatherlea
 Hokio Beach
 Ihakara
 Koputaroa
 Kuku
 Makahika
 Manakau
 Muhunoa
 Muhunoa East
 Ōhau
 Poroutawhao
 Waikawa Beach
 Waitarere Beach

Demographics

Horowhenua District had a population of 33,261 at the 2018 New Zealand census, an increase of 3,165 people (10.5%) since the 2013 census, and an increase of 3,393 people (11.4%) since the 2006 census. There were 13,230 households. There were 16,143 males and 17,118 females, giving a sex ratio of 0.94 males per female. The median age was 46.8 years (compared with 37.4 years nationally), with 6,087 people (18.3%) aged under 15 years, 5,244 (15.8%) aged 15 to 29, 13,707 (41.2%) aged 30 to 64, and 8,223 (24.7%) aged 65 or older.

Ethnicities were 81.0% European/Pākehā, 24.5% Māori, 5.7% Pacific peoples, 4.1% Asian, and 1.6% other ethnicities. People may identify with more than one ethnicity.

The percentage of people born overseas was 14.1, compared with 27.1% nationally.

Although some people objected to giving their religion, 51.1% had no religion, 36.0% were Christian, 0.4% were Hindu, 0.1% were Muslim, 0.4% were Buddhist and 2.9% had other religions.

Of those at least 15 years old, 2,877 (10.6%) people had a bachelor or higher degree, and 7,806 (28.7%) people had no formal qualifications. The median income was $23,900, compared with $31,800 nationally. 2,337 people (8.6%) earned over $70,000 compared to 17.2% nationally. The employment status of those at least 15 was that 10,905 (40.1%) people were employed full-time, 3,567 (13.1%) were part-time, and 1,311 (4.8%) were unemployed.

Land use
Much of the area was once an extensive wetland and the centre of a substantial flax industry. It has been progressively drained and converted to productive but flood-prone farmland, with a mixture of loam and peat based soils. Some parts of the wetland, particularly those around Lake Horowhenua are being returned to their former state as a conservation area, with the help of local Māori. One of the local tribal authorities is the Muaūpoko Tribal Authority.

Museums
 Te Awahou Nieuwe Stroom – Foxton
 Piriharakeke Generation Inspiration Centre – Foxton
 Oranjehof Dutch Connection Centre – Foxton
 Flax Stripper Museum – Foxton
 MAVTech – Museum of Audiovisual Technology – Foxton

Schools

Secondary:
 Manawatū College, Foxton
 Horowhenua College, Levin
 Waiopehu College, Levin

Primary:

 Foxton Beach School, Foxton Beach
 Coley Street School, Foxton
 Foxton Primary, Foxton
 St. Marys, Foxton
 Levin East School, Levin
 Fairfield School, Levin
 Ohau School, Ohau (Levin Rural)
 Koputuroa School, Levin Rural
 St. Josephs, Levin
 Levin School, Levin
 Levin North School, Levin
 Taitoko School, Levin
 Poroutawhao School, Levin Rural
 Shannon School, Shannon
 Manakau School, Manakau
 Opiki School, Opiki
 Tokomaru School, Tokomaru

Intermediate:
Levin Intermediate, Levin

Sport
In rugby, a combined Horowhenua-Kapiti team represents the area in the amateur Heartland Championship.

In cricket, a Horowhenua-Kapiti team has competed in the Hawke Cup since 2002.

References

External links

Horowhenua District Council

 
Districts of New Zealand